Entente Sportive de Bonchamp Football (commonly referred to as ES Bonchamp or simply Bonchamp) is a French football club based in Bonchamp-lès-Laval in the Pays de la Loire region. The club was founded in 1964 and is a part of a sports club that features over ten other sports. Bonchamp currently plays in the Championnat de France amateur 2, the fifth division of French football, after achieving promotion from the Division d'Honneur in the 2009–10 season.

Bonchamp reached the 1/32-finals of the 2009–10 Coupe de France, losing 2–0 to title-holders Guingamp.

References

External links
 Official site

Association football clubs established in 1964
1964 establishments in France
Football clubs in Pays de la Loire
Sport in Mayenne